Porcelliidae is an extinct family of gastropods in the clade Vetigastropoda (according to the taxonomy of the Gastropoda by Bouchet & Rocroi, 2005).

Taxonomy 
This family consists of two following subfamilies (according to the taxonomy of the Gastropoda by Bouchet & Rocroi, 2005):
 Porcellinae Koken, 1895
 Agnesiinae Knight, 1956

Genera

References